The Hustle Award is an annual National Basketball Association (NBA) award given since 2017 to players that "best utilize hustle to help their teams win on a nightly basis." The award is decided using a metric known as "hustle stats," which tracks defensive and offensive efforts such as diving for loose balls, taking charges, deflections, setting screens, and contesting shots. Patrick Beverley was the inaugural winner of the award.

Winners

References

National Basketball Association awards
National Basketball Association lists
Awards established in 2017